Richard Woodward may refer to:

 Richard Woodward (bishop) (1726–1794), Bishop of Cloyne in the Church of Ireland
 Richard Woodward (organist) (1743–1777), organist of Christ Church Cathedral, Dublin
 Richard B. Woodward, arts critic for The New York Times